Alan Mariano Miño (born March 28, 1994) is an Argentinian footballer who plays for Belgrano.

Early life
He was born in Tigre, Argentina and played in the youth system of River Plate for three years. His family then moved to Mercedes, Argentina where he spent the rest of his youth, playing in the system of Comunicaciones. He helped them win the 2015 Supercopa Correntina over Boca Unidos with a man of the match performance. In 2015, he fractured his tibia, which caused him to be out for six months.

Playing career
After recovering from the injury, Miño began his professional career with Primera B Nacional side Boca Unidos, signing a three year contract, but with the option for him to terminate the contract at any time. After the season, he trialed and then signed with Uruguayan Primera División side Sud América.

He then signed with Canadian club Toronto FC II in the United Soccer League ahead of their 2018 season. On 20 April 2018, he was signed to a deal with their parent club Toronto FC in Major League Soccer. He made his debut as a substitute on 21 April in a 5-1 loss against the Houston Dynamo in a match that the majority of the first-team missed, due to travelling for a CONCACAF Champions League match. He won a penalty kick in the 90th minute for the team after being fouled in the penalty area, but the resulting penalty kick was missed by teammate Ager Aketxe. On 30 June 2018, Miño was waived by Toronto, after making only one appearance for the first-team, and five with the second-team.

Afterwards, he returned to the Argentine second tier signing with Villa Dálmine. The following season he joined Agropecuario in the same division, on a multi-year contract. In March 2021, he joined Belgrano in the same division.

Career statistics

References

External links
 
 
 Toronto FC profile

Living people
1994 births
Argentine footballers
Argentine expatriate footballers
People from Tigre, Buenos Aires
Sportspeople from Buenos Aires Province
Association football midfielders
Boca Unidos footballers
Sud América players
Toronto FC II players
Toronto FC players
Villa Dálmine footballers
Club Agropecuario Argentino players
Club Atlético Belgrano footballers
USL Championship players
Major League Soccer players
Argentine expatriate sportspeople in Uruguay
Argentine expatriate sportspeople in Canada
Expatriate soccer players in Canada
Expatriate footballers in Uruguay